The Harris River is a  tidal river within the city of Hampton in the U.S. state of Virginia. It is a southerly arm of the Back River, an inlet of Chesapeake Bay.

See also
List of rivers of Virginia

References

USGS Hydrologic Unit Map - State of Virginia (1974)

Rivers of Virginia
Rivers of Hampton, Virginia